The Disney Junior channels in the EMEA are originally owned by The Walt Disney Company Europe, Middle East & Africa, based in the U.S. counterpart. Targeted to preschoolers 2 to 7 years old. Began in the United Kingdom on 7 May 2011, and later expanded into several countries throughout the year.

Most EMEA feeds (except for the Israeli feed) are synced in the same schedule also based in the United Kingdom, despite the UK feed loss.

Availability

Current

France 
Originally launched as Playhouse Disney on 2 November 2002, along with Disney Channel +1 and Toon Disney; later rebranded as Disney Junior on 28 May 2011 in both SD and HD. Available through France and its overseas territories, Francophone Africa, Haiti, Luxembourg, and partially Belgium.

CEE, Middle East and Africa (CEMA) 
A pan-regional feed available through Bulgaria, Greece, Cyprus, Poland, Romania, Turkey with the Middle East (except, Iran, Israel, and Syria), most of Africa, and the Balkan countries. Launched on 1 June 2011, while 1 March 2012 in Romania. The Polish and Romanian transmissions airs local advertisements. Since 2016, it began broadcasting in Arabic. In the Czech Republic, it only aired with Czech subtitles. In Turkey, it is the only Disney-branded TV channel since April 2022.

Spain 
Became available from 11 June 2011, replacing Playhouse Disney (which was launched on 16 November 2001) with a Spanish language track. It is also available in Andorra.

Israel 
Launched on 18 July 2011 on Yes satellite and on 27 November 2013 on HOT Cable, under The Walt Disney Company Israel. It's programming is not synced with the other EMEA feeds.

Scandinavia 
Launched on 10 September 2011, available through Nordic and Baltic countries. Available with the Danish, Norwegian, Finnish, Russian and Swedish languages; airing local advertisements in selected Nordic countries. The channel closed on Allente on 28 February 2023.

Belgium 

Launched on 10 September 2011, available in Dutch.

Portugal 
Launched on 1 November 2012 replacing Disney Cinemagic. Since March 2021, an HD transmission launched. It is also available in Angola and Mozambique via Zap and DStv packages.

Defunct

Hungary 
Initially available between 1 July 2015 to December 2017 with a Hungarian language track.

Netherlands 

Initially available between 10 September 2011 to 1 April 2019. Selected programs moved to Disney Channel in 2020.

Italy 
It was available on from 14 May 2011 to 1 May 2020, later moved to Disney+.

UK and Ireland 

It was the first Disney Junior to launch in the EMEA; originally launched as Playhouse Disney on 29 September 2000. Later rebranded as Disney Junior on 7 May 2011. It ceases broadcast on 1 October 2020 with programs moving to Disney+.

Germany 
It was available across Germany, Austria and Switzerland between 14 July 2011 to 30 September 2021. Selected programs later moved to Disney Channel.

External links

TV schedules 

 Belgium (Dutch)
 Belgium (French)
 Bulgaria
 Czech Republic
 Denmark
 France
 Greece
 MENA (Arabic)
 MENA (English)
 Norway
 Poland
 Portugal
 Romania
 South Africa
 Spain
 Sweden

References 

Disney Junior
Mass media in the United Kingdom
2011 establishments in Europe